The Slovenia Billie Jean King Cup team represents Slovenia in the Billie Jean King Cup tennis competition and are governed by the Slovene Tennis Association.  They currently compete in the World Group II.

History
Slovenia competed in its first Fed Cup in 1992.  Their best result was reaching the quarterfinals in 2003.  Prior to 1992, Slovenian players represented Yugoslavia.

Current team (2022)
Tamara Zidanšek
Kaja Juvan
Ziva Falkner
Lara Smejkal
Pia Lovrič

See also
Fed Cup
Slovenia Davis Cup team

External links

Billie Jean King Cup teams
Fed Cup
Fed Cup